is one of the main schools of Japanese tea ceremony.

The name , literally meaning "rear  house/family", came into existence due to the location of the homestead of this line of the  family in relation to what was originally the frontmost house (the ) of the  estate.

History

However, as his activities became centered in Kyoto, he kept a house in Kyoto.

After a number of months, however, both were able to return home.

's retirement quarters became 's home base, with  eventually becoming heir to the property.

During this period,  went by the name . In his later life, however,  returned to the  family, establishing a tea room named "" at his residence on  street, and retrained as a  expert. With this, the direct descendants of  branched into the three lines of both the  family and schools of tea ceremony known as the  today.

Before the Meiji Restoration (1868), the heads of the three families served as  magistrates under various , receiving a yearly stipend from them as payment for their respective services. In generations following this, the head of the  family also served as a  magistrate for the  clan of the  domain (present day  Prefecture), as well as serving as caretaker to the clan's Kyoto residence. The head of the eleventh generation of the family,  (1810–77), born as the fifth son of a minor  named  of the  domain, married into the  family, whilst also serving the  branch of the Tokugawa family. However, following the fall of the Tokugawa shogunate in 1868, the  lost their positions, and the hereditary stipends which the three  families had been receiving came to an end.

Headmasters

From the fourth generation onwards, the three family lineages divide, with the heads of each family carrying the professional hereditary name used by the successive heads of their respective family.

Urasenke Foundation

Its administrative office, together with that of the  Federation, is located within the five story  Center building located a short distance west of the historical  compound.

Center

Research Center

Library

Branches
The Urasenke Tokyo Branch was originally established in 1957 in Tokyo's  ward, moving to its present quarters in the  section of Tokyo's  ward in 1995. This  facility serves as the hub of the activities sponsored by the  head house in Japan's capital. The  Tokyo Branch is the only  branch in Japan.

The dates and places to which the teachers were dispatched and thus an  branch or liaison office was established were as follows:
 
 1966, September. Hawaii (Honolulu), and Boston
 1967, September. New York
 1969, August. Rome, Italy 
 1972, June. Munich, Germany, when  donated a tea house named 
 1973, February. Mexico (Mexico City)
 1973, August. Hilo, Hawaii
 1974, March. Brisbane (liaison office), Australia
 1974, November. Peru (Lima)
 1976, April. London, England; Düsseldorf, Germany; and Paris, France 
 1976, August. Brazil (São Paulo)
 1980, December. San Francisco, California
 1981, February. Seattle, Washington
 1986, May. Schwarzwald (liaison office; became Freiburg liaison office in 1997, April), Germany
 1991, March. Moscow (liaison office), Russia
 1991, May. Beijing (liaison office; became branch in 1993), China
 1992, August. Tianjin (liaison office), China
 1993, April. Vancouver (liaison office; became branch in 1994), Canada
 1993, August. Sydney, Australia
 1994, September. Washington D.C.
 1997, April. Netherlands (liaison office)

Independently registered  Foundation corporations
The Urasenke Foundation of Hawaii, headquartered at the  Hawaii Branch, was established as a USA registered non-profit corporation in 1976

The Urasenke Tea Ceremony Society, Inc, headquartered at the  Center, was established as a USA registered non-profit corporation in 1981, when the  New York Branch moved into the newly opened  Center, located at 153 East 69th St. in New York.

The  Foundation of California, headquartered at the  San Francisco Branch, was founded as a USA registered non-profit organization in 1994. It is generally known as  Foundation San Francisco.

Urasenke Tankōkai
The Urasenke Tankōkai (裏千家淡交会) is the membership organization for Urasenke teachers and students. It was initiated in 1940 by the fourteenth-generation head of Urasenke, Tantansai (1893-1964), with the aim of unifying and encouraging the practitioners of Urasenke chadō. In 1953, it was registered by the Ministry of Education and Culture as a not-for-profit incorporated association (shadan hōjin). It is now registered as a not-for-profit general incorporated association (ippan shadan hōjin). Its official registered name, as such, is Ippan Shadan Hōjin Chadō Urasenke Tankōkai (一般社団法人茶道裏千家淡交会). In English, it is referred to as the Urasenke Tankōkai Federation. Its stated aims are to ensure the standardization of the Urasenke chanoyu rules and tea-making procedures (temae), support research, encourage cooperation and exchange among all members, promote the practice of the principles laid down by the grand master, and expand the chadō population around the world. Also, it provides support for the purposes and activities of the Urasenke Foundation.

In Japan, the organization is divided into seventeen districts comprising 165 chapters (shibu) and 2 sub-chapters (shisho). Each district has a liaison council for the Gakkō Chadō (Tea Training in the Educational System) program sponsored by the organization. There are also 167 groups belonging to the organization's Seinenbu, or "Youth Division." These three entities organize seminars, tea gatherings, conventions, and many other activities. The central office, serving to coordinate the programs and activities of all these, is located in the Urasenke Center building at Urasenke headquarters, Kyoto. Twice a year, in the spring and autumn, it calls together a national meeting of chapter presidents, to decide upon general policies and activities. In 1999, the International Division of the Urasenke Foundation was moved under the umbrella of this office, effectively extending the organization to overseas regions. Currently there are 92 official Chadō Urasenke Tankōkai associations spread over 37 countries outside Japan.

Gakkō Chadō

Seinenbu 
The Urasenke Tankōkai Seinenbu (裏千家淡交会青年部), or Urasenke Tankōkai Youth Division, is an organization for Urasenke chadō enthusiasts under the age of fifty. It was initiated in 1950 by the then Urasenke 15th-generation iemoto-to-be, Sen Sōkō, aiming to muster the combined power of Urasenke's youths toward rebuilding the war-torn nation. Its creed is "Train (修練) in order to better oneself; Serve (奉仕) your community; Friendship (友情) toward the world and among members." At first, the organization was called Seinenkai. This name was changed to Seinenbu in 1963. The organization's first chapters were established in Kure and Hiroshima in May, 1950. In 1966, the organization held its first National Convention, at the Kyoto International Conference Hall, at which there were over 2,200 attendees. In 1974, the organization's first chartered Urasenke Youth Ship (裏千家青年の船) friendship mission, with 418 participants, sailed to Okinawa and Hong Kong.

Urasenke Gakuen
The Urasenke Gakuen Chadō Senmon Gakkō (裏千家学園茶道専門学校), or "Urasenke Gakuen Professional College of Chadō," is generally known as the Urasenke Gakuen. It is located on the same neighborhood block as the Urasenke home in Kyoto, and is the only accredited school in Japan specializing in chadō education. It had its start in 1962, as the Urasenke Chadō Kenshūjō (裏千家茶道研修所), or "Urasenke Chadō Training Institute," run by Urasenke's incorporated foundation, Zaidan Hōjin Konnichian (known in English as the Urasenke Foundation). In 1971, its name was changed to "Urasenke Gakuen," and in 1976, its name was changed again, to "Urasenke Gakuen Chadō Senmon Gakkō." In 1983, it had its new start as a registered educational foundation (学校法人), and was formally accredited as a professional college by the Ministry of Education.

The number one characteristic of this professional college is that it is a chadō training center directly connected to the Urasenke Iemoto. The current Chairman of the Urasenke Gakuen Educational Foundation, and Principal of the Urasenke Gakuen Professional College, is Masako Sen, who is the wife of Urasenke Iemoto Sōshitsu Sen XVI.

In addition to its regular three-year course, which is referred to as the chadō-ka (茶道科) and provides a basic, comprehensive chadō education, it also has a separate one-year course and a graduate course referred to as the kenkyūka (研究科, "research course").

Furthermore, the Urasenke Gakuen has a non-Japanese students division called the "Midorikai" (lit., "green group"). The Midorikai study program is an intensive one-year program in which the students are provided with lectures and other instruction in English.

Urasenke in popular culture
 The Choose Your Own Adventure book: Mystery of Ura Senke (nº 44), by Shannon Gilligan, deals with the theft of one of the Urasenke school's most famous tea ceremony bowls, worth millions of yen on the black market. The protagonist and their friend Kenichi Doi, whose older brother Takashi is an Urasenke school apprentice, start investigating the case.

References

 "SEN Soshitsu XVI, Iemoto" in Urasenke website.
 "The Urasenke Legacy" in Urasenke website.
 "Konnichian--The Urasenke Home" in Urasenke website.
 Urasenke Chadō Textbook. Supervising Eds., Genshitsu Sen and Sōshitsu Sen (Kyoto, Tankosha Publishing Co., 2011).

External links

Urasenke official homepage

Chadō